Taras Yavorskyi (born 9 June 1989) is a professional Ukrainian football midfielder who plays for FC Nyva Ternopil in the Ukrainian Second League.

Yavorskyi is the product of the Karpaty Sportive School in Lviv. His first coaches were Andriy Karimov and Taras Tkachyk.

He signed a contract with FC Lviv in 2008, but only made his debut for the first team in a match against FC Dnipro Dnipropetrovsk in the Ukrainian Premier League on 28 February 2009.

References

External links
Profile at Official FFU site (Ukr)

1989 births
Living people
Ukrainian footballers
FC Lviv players
MFC Mykolaiv players
FC Bukovyna Chernivtsi players
FC Nyva Ternopil players
Association football midfielders
Sportspeople from Lviv